Program music or programmatic  music is a type of instrumental art music that attempts to musically render an extramusical narrative. The narrative itself might be offered to the audience through the piece's title, or in the form of program notes, inviting imaginative correlations with the music. A well-known example is Sergei Prokofiev's Peter and the Wolf. 

The genre culminates in the symphonic works of Richard Strauss that include narrations of the adventures of Don Quixote, Till Eulenspiegel, the composer's domestic life, and an interpretation of Friedrich Nietzsche's philosophy of the Übermensch. Following Strauss, the genre declined and new works with explicitly narrative content are rare. Nevertheless the genre continues to exert an influence on film music, especially where this draws upon the techniques of 19th-century late romantic music. Similar compositional forms also exist within popular music, including the concept album and rock opera.

The term is almost exclusively applied to works in the European classical music tradition, particularly those from the Romantic music period of the 19th century, during which the concept was popular, but pieces which fit the description have long been a part of music. The term is usually reserved for purely instrumental works (pieces without singers and lyrics), and not used, for example for opera or lieder. Single-movement orchestral pieces of program music are often called symphonic poems. Absolute music, in contrast, is intended to be appreciated without any particular reference to the outside world.

16th and 17th centuries
Composers of the Renaissance wrote a fair amount of program music, especially for the harpsichord, including works such as Martin Peerson's The Fall of the Leafe and William Byrd's The Battell. For the latter work, the composer provided this written description of the sections: "Souldiers sommons, marche of footemen, marche of horsmen, trumpetts, Irishe marche, bagpipe and the drone, flute and the droome, marche to the fighte, the battels be joyned, retreat, galliarde for the victorie."

18th century
In the Baroque era, Vivaldi's The Four Seasons has poetic inscriptions in the score referring to each of the seasons, evoking spring, summer, autumn, and winter. While many cantatas by J. S. Bach contain programmatic elements, an example of outright program music is his Capriccio on the departure of a beloved brother, BWV 992.

Program music was perhaps less often composed in the Classical era. At that time, perhaps more than any other, music achieved drama from its own internal resources, notably in works written in sonata form. It is thought, however, that a number of Joseph Haydn's earlier symphonies may be program music; for example, the composer once said that one of his earlier symphonies represents "a dialogue between God and the Sinner". It is not known which of his symphonies Haydn was referring to. His Symphony No. 8 also includes a movement named "La tempesta" that represents a storm. A minor Classical-era composer, Carl Ditters von Dittersdorf, wrote a series of symphonies based on Ovid's Metamorphoses (not to be confused with twentieth-century composer Benjamin Britten's Six Metamorphoses after Ovid), which falls into this category. German composer Justin Heinrich Knecht's Le portrait musical de la nature, ou Grande sinfonie (Musical Portrait of Nature or Grand Symphony) from 1784–1785 is another 18th century example, anticipating Beethoven's Pastoral Symphony by twenty years.

19th century
Program music particularly flourished in the Romantic era. As it can invoke in the listener a specific experience other than sitting in front of a musician or musicians, it is related to the purely Romantic idea of the Gesamtkunstwerk describing Wagner's Operas as a fusion of many arts (set design, choreography, poetry and so on), although it relies solely on musical aspects to illustrate a multi-faceted artistic concept such as a poem or a painting. Composers believed that the dynamics of sound that were newly possible in the Romantic orchestra of the era allowed them to focus on emotions and other intangible aspects of life much more than during the Baroque or Classical eras.

Ludwig van Beethoven felt a certain reluctance in writing program music, and said of his 1808 Symphony No. 6 (Pastoral) that the "whole work can be perceived without description – it is more an expression of feelings rather than tone-painting".. Yet the work clearly contains depictions of bird calls, a babbling brook, a storm, and so on. Beethoven later returned to program music with his Piano Sonata Op. 81a, Les Adieux, which depicts the departure and return of his close friend the Archduke Rudolf.

Hector Berlioz's Symphonie fantastique was a musical narration of a hyperbolically emotional love story, the main subject being an actress with whom he was in love at the time. Franz Liszt did provide explicit programs for many of his piano pieces and he was also the inventor of the term symphonic poem. In 1874, Modest Mussorgsky composed for piano a series of pieces describing seeing a gallery of ten of his friend's paintings and drawings in his Pictures at an Exhibition, later orchestrated by many composers including Maurice Ravel. The French composer Camille Saint-Saëns wrote many short pieces of program music which he called Tone Poems. His most famous are probably the Danse Macabre and several movements from the Carnival of the Animals. The composer Paul Dukas is perhaps best known for his tone poem The Sorcerer's Apprentice, based on a tale from Goethe.

Possibly the most adept at musical depiction in his program music was German composer Richard Strauss. His symphonic poems include Death and Transfiguration (portraying a dying man and his entry into heaven), Don Juan (based on the ancient legend of Don Juan), Till Eulenspiegel's Merry Pranks (based on episodes in the career of the legendary German figure Till Eulenspiegel), Don Quixote (portraying episodes in the life of Miguel de Cervantes' character, Don Quixote), A Hero's Life (which depicts episodes in the life of an unnamed hero often taken to be Strauss himself) and Symphonia Domestica (which portrays episodes in the composer's own married life, including putting the baby to bed). Strauss is reported to have said that music can describe anything, even a teaspoon.

Another composer of programmatic music is Nikolai Rimsky-Korsakov, whose colorful "musical pictures" include "Sadko", Op. 5, after the Russian Bylina, about the minstrel who sings to the Tsar of the Sea, the very famous "'Scheherazade", Op. 35, after the Arabian Nights entertainments (where the heroine is depicted by a violin and whose stories include "Sinbad the Sailor") and any number of orchestral suites from his operas, including The Tale of Tsar Saltan (which also contains "Flight of the Bumblebee"), The Golden Cockerel, Christmas Eve, The Snow Maiden, and The Legend of The Invisible City of Kitezh.

In Scandinavia, Sibelius explored the Kalevala legend in several tone poems, most famously in The Swan of Tuonela.

One of the most famous programs, because it has never been definitively identified, is the secret non-musical idea or theme – the "Enigma" – that underlies Edward Elgar's Variations on an Original Theme (Enigma) of 1899. The composer disclosed it to certain friends, but at his request they never made it public.

20th century
Ottorino Respighi composed a number of tone poems in the 1910s and 1920s, notably three works on different aspects of the city of Rome. Gustav Holst's "The Planets" is another well-known example. Alban Berg's Lyric Suite was thought for years to be abstract music, but in 1977 it was discovered that it was in fact dedicated to Hanna Fuchs-Robettin. Important leitmotifs are based on the melodic series A–B–H–F, which is their combined initials. The last movement also contains a setting of a poem by Charles Baudelaire, suppressed by the composer for publication.

Popular music as program music
The term "program music" is not generally used with regard to popular music, although some popular music does have aspects in common with program music. The tradition of purely orchestral program music is continued in pieces for jazz orchestra, most notably several pieces by Duke Ellington. Instrumental pieces in popular music often have a descriptive title which suggests that they could be categorized as program music, and several instrumental albums are completely devoted to some programmatic idea (for example, China by Vangelis or The Songs of Distant Earth by Mike Oldfield). Some of the genres of popular music are more likely than others to involve programmatic elements; these include ambient, new-age, space music, surf rock, black metal, jazz fusion, progressive rock, art rock and various genres of techno music. Bluegrass has at least one outstanding bit of program music called Orange Blossom Special. 

Progressive rock groups and musicians during the 1970s in particular experimented with program music, among which was Rush's "Jacob's Ladder" (1980), which shows clear influences of Smetana's Má vlast ("My Homeland") (1874–1879). In addition, Rush's songs "Xanadu", "La Villa Strangiato" "Red Barchetta", and "YYZ" also show their experimentalism with program music, as do parts of "2112", particularly the discovery scene.

Definition
Composers and some theorists argue that there is indeed no such thing as true "absolute (ars gratia artis) music" and that music always at least conveys or evokes emotions. While non-professional listeners often claim that music has meaning (to them), "new" musicologists, such as Susan McClary, argue that so-called "abstract" techniques and structures are actually highly politically and socially charged, specifically, even gendered. This may be linked to a more general argument against abstraction, such as Mark Johnson's argument that it is, "necessary...for abstract meaning...to have a bodily basis". However, a more specific definition of absolute music is: music which was composed without programmatic intent, or narrative.

More traditional listeners often reject these views sharply, asserting that music can be meaningful, as well as deeply emotional, while being essentially about itself (notes, themes, keys, and so on), and without any connection to the political and societal conflicts of our own day, but consciously associated with non-musical ideas, images, or events (poems, art works, etc.)

In the Western canon

18th century
Part of the music from the Baroque and Classical eras is absolute, as is suggested by titles which often consist simply of the type of composition, a numerical designation within the composer's oeuvre, and its key. Johann Sebastian Bach's Concerto for two harpsichords in C minor, BWV 1060 and Mozart's Piano Sonata in C major, K. 545 are examples of absolute music.

Some composers of the Baroque era used to design titles for their music in a fashion resembling that of Romantic program music, called the rappresentativo (representative) style. Some of the most notable examples were composed by Antonio Vivaldi – some of his violin, flute or recorder concertos bear titles inspired by human affects (Il piacere – the pleasure), occupations (La caccia – the hunting, La pastorella – the shepherdess) or, most notably, aspects of nature and meteors (The Four Seasons, La notte – the night, La tempesta di mare – the sea storm). Another well-known example is Heinrich Ignaz Biber's Sonata representativa (for violin and continuo), which depicts various animals (the nightingale, the cuckoo, the cat) in a humoristic manner. However, a distinction may be drawn between "representational" music and program music properly speaking, as well as between "imitation" and "representation. Finally, there is the question of whether a deliberate expressive character is sufficient to rank as a "program".

19th century
Program music was quite popular during the Romantic era. Many mainstream "classical" works are unequivocally program music, such as Richard Strauss's An Alpine Symphony, which is a musical description of ascending and descending a mountain, with 22 section titles such as "Night", "Sunrise", "By the Waterfall", "In Thicket and Underbrush on the Wrong Path", "Summit", "Mists Rise" and "Storm and Descent". Beethoven's Symphony No. 6 is program music, too, with titled movements and instrumental depictions of bird calls, country dances, and a storm. His fifteenth string quartet, Opus 132, contains a middle movement titled "Heiliger Dankgesang eines Genesenen an die Gottheit, in der lydischen Tonart" ('A Convalescent's Holy Song of Thanksgiving to the Divinity, in the Lydian Mode'), suggesting to some auditors that the entire work can be heard as a tonal evocation of sickness and recovery.

20th century
During the late-nineteenth and twentieth century, the increased influence of modernism and other anti-Romantic trends contributed to a decline in esteem for program music, but audiences continued to enjoy such pieces as Arthur Honegger's depiction of a steam locomotive in Pacific 231 (1923). Indeed, Percy Grainger's incomplete orchestral fragment Train Music employs the same function. This music for large orchestra depicts a train moving in the mountains of Italy. Heitor Villa-Lobos similarly depicted a rural steam-driven train in The Little Train of the Caipira (1930).

Indeed, an entire genre sprang up in the 1920s, particularly in the Soviet Union, of picturesque music depicting machines and factories. Well-known examples include Alexander Mosolov's Iron Foundry (1926–27) and Sergei Prokofiev's Le Pas d'acier (The Steel Step, 1926). An example from outside of the Soviet Union is George Antheil's Ballet mécanique (1923–24).

Opera and ballet
Music that is composed to accompany a ballet is often program music, even when presented separately as a concert piece. Aaron Copland was amused when a listener said that when she listened to Appalachian Spring she "could see the Appalachians and feel Spring", the title having been a last-minute thought, but it is certainly program music. Film scores and the orchestration in operas are very often program music, and some film scores, such as Prokofiev's music for Alexander Nevsky, have even found a place in the classical concert repertoire.

Programmatic music and abstract imagery
A good deal of program music falls in between the realm of purely programmatic and purely absolute, with titles that clearly suggest an extramusical association, but no detailed story that can be followed and no musical passages that can be unequivocally identified with specific images. Examples would include Dvořák's Symphony No. 9, From the New World or Beethoven's Symphony No. 3, Eroica.

Motion picture soundtrack
Influenced by the late Romantic work of Nikolai Rimsky-Korsakov, Ottorino Respighi, Richard Strauss, and others, motion picture soundtrack took up the banner of programmatic music following the advent of "talkies". Many film composers, including Paul Smith, Ennio Morricone, and John Williams (whose 1977 Star Wars soundtrack redefined the symphonic movie score) have followed the programmatic model and solidified motion picture soundtrack as its own programmatic genre. Music's power for pictorial suggestion may be said to have culminated in Walt Disney's 1940 film Fantasia. Disney gave us, too, the term Mickey Mousing, used to describe scores that mimic too obviously the movements of nature. The music of Max Steiner, for instance, often lauded for its uncanny sound-image synchronization, has also been assailed for being too "Mickey Mouse".

See also
Character piece
Figurative art
Film music
Incidental music
List of program music
List of symphonic poems
Mickey Mousing
Representation (arts)
Sakadas of Argos
Word painting

References

Sources

Further reading
Junod, Philippe. "The New Paragone: Paradoxes and Contradictions of Pictorial Musicalism", in The Arts Entwined: Music and Painting in the Nineteenth Century, eds. M. L. Morton and P. L. Schmunk, p. 28–29
Pérez-Sobrino, Paula B. 2014.  "Meaning construction in verbomusical environments: Conceptual disintegration and metonymy" in Journal of Pragmatics v. 70: 130–151

External links
"Program music", Encyclopedia.com
Composers: Vivaldi, Essentials of Music
Cleveland Baroque Orchestra: Program note for: Beethoven & Schubert in Vienna, Apollo's Fire

Alban Berg: Lyric Suite, Kronos Quartet with Dawn Upshaw, review by Robert Levine
Programmatic programmatic works by American composers, Art of the States
Information on The Kaidan Suite, a musical interpretation of Japanese ghost stories by the Kitsune Ensemble

Musical terminology
Musical form